Diamond Township is one of sixteen townships in Cherokee County, Iowa, USA.  As of the 2000 census, its population was 215.

Geography
According to the USGS, it contains one cemetery, Diamond.

References

External links
 US-Counties.com
 City-Data.com

Townships in Cherokee County, Iowa
Townships in Iowa